Stop Thief! is a lost 1915 silent film comedy drama directed by George Fitzmaurice and starring Mary Ryan. It was produced by George Kleine and released through Kleine and Edison.

Cast
Mary Ryan - Nell Jones
Harry Mestayer - Jack Doogan
 Harold Howard - Mr. Cluney
Albert Tavernier - Mr. Carr
William "Stage" Boyd - Dr. Willoughby
Augusta Burmeister - Mrs. Carr
Della Connor - Joan Carr
Marguerite Boyd - Madge Carr
Dan Moyles - The Detective
Soldine Powel - The Clergyman

References

External links

1915 films
American silent feature films
American films based on plays
Films directed by George Fitzmaurice
Lost American films
American black-and-white films
1915 lost films
Films produced by George Kleine
1910s American films
Silent American comedy-drama films
Lost comedy-drama films